The Hype is a news magazine television series for the Australian and New Zealand audience on E!produced by Oxygen360 Sydney. It premiered on 17 October 2015 at 5:30pm and 10:30pm. It is co-hosted by Dominic Bowden from New Zealand and Ksenija Lukich from Australia.

The weekly program features celebrity, fashion and entertainment news. The series is the first full-length weekly entertainment programme from E! designed for the Australian and New Zealand regions, and the second local commission after Fashion Bloggers.

References 

2015 Australian television series debuts
2015 New Zealand television series debuts
English-language television shows
E! original programming